Cinearte was a Brazilian magazine about cinema, which was founded in Rio de Janeiro on March 3, 1926. Its founders were Mario Behring and Adhemar Gonzaga.

Cinearte was published on a weekly basis. The magazine first attempted to lay a bridge between Brazilian cinema and North American cinema. However, it later focused on national cinema. The magazine ceased publication in July 1942.

References

External links
 Official website

1926 establishments in Brazil
1942 disestablishments in Brazil
Magazines published in Brazil
Weekly magazines published in Brazil
Defunct magazines published in Brazil
Film magazines
Magazines established in 1926
Magazines disestablished in 1942
Mass media in Rio de Janeiro (city)
Portuguese-language magazines